The 102nd Infantry Division ("Ozark") was a unit of the United States Army in World War II. The unit is currently active as the 102nd Training Division (Maneuver Support).

Interwar period
The division was constituted in the Organized Reserve on 24 June 1921, allotted to the Seventh Corps Area, and assigned to the XVII Corps, with Arkansas and Missouri as its home area. The headquarters was organized on 2 September 1921 at 3d and Olive Streets in St. Louis, and relocated in 1923 to the Old Customhouse. The HQ remained there until activated for World War II. To encourage esprit de corps, the division adopted the nickname “Ozark” after the mountainous region that ran through both home area states, and the division staff published a newsletter titled “Ozark.” The division formed rapidly and by November 1922, it was up to 95 percent strength in its complement of officers as required by its peacetime tables of organization. The designated mobilization and training station for the division was Fort Riley, KS. The HQ and staff usually trained at Fort Leavenworth, KS. The subordinate infantry regiments of the division held their summer training primarily with the 17th Infantry Regiment at Fort Leavenworth.

In the 1920s and 1930s Harry S. Truman, a lieutenant colonel in the Officers' Reserve Corps, commanded the division's 1st Battalion, 379th Field Artillery Regiment.  After promotion to colonel, Truman advanced to command of the 379th Field Artillery Regiment.

World War II
Ordered into active military service: 15 September 1942 at Camp Maxey, Texas
Overseas: 12 September 1944 
Campaigns: Rhineland, Central Europe 
Days of combat: 173 
Distinguished Unit Citations: 4 
Awards: DSC-8; DSM-1 ; SS-686; LM-15; SM-39 ; BSM-5,498 ; AM-91. 
Commanders: Major General John B. Anderson (September 1942 – December 1943), Major General Frank A. Keating (8 January 1944 – February 1946), Brigadier General Charles M. Busbee (February 1946 to inactivation).
Assistant Division Commanders (partial list): Lloyd D. Brown (May 1942 – February 1943), Alonzo Patrick Fox (April 1943 – May 1945)
Returned to U.S.: 11 March 1946. 
Inactivated: 23 March 1946.

Order of battle

 Headquarters, 102nd Infantry Division
 405th Infantry Regiment 
 406th Infantry Regiment
 407th Infantry Regiment
 Headquarters and Headquarters Battery, 102d Infantry Division Artillery
 379th Field Artillery Battalion (105 mm)
 380th Field Artillery Battalion (105 mm)
 381st Field Artillery Battalion (155 mm)
 927th Field Artillery Battalion (105 mm)
327th Engineer Combat Battalion
327th Medical Battalion
102nd Cavalry Reconnaissance Troop (Mechanized)
Headquarters, Special Troops, 102nd Infantry Division
Headquarters Company, 102nd Infantry Division
802nd Ordnance Light Maintenance Company
102nd Quartermaster Company
102nd Signal Company
Military Police Platoon
Band
 102nd Counterintelligence Corps Detachment

Combat chronicle
The 102nd Infantry Division, under the command of Major General Frank A. Keating, arrived on the Western Front in the European Theater of Operations (ETO) at Cherbourg, France, 23 September 1944, and, after a short period of training near Valognes, moved to the German-Netherlands border. On 26 October, elements attached to other divisions entered combat and on 3 November the division assumed responsibility for the sector from the Wurm to Waurichen. A realignment of sectors and the return of elements placed the 102nd in full control of its units for the first time, 24 November 1944, as it prepared for an attack to the Roer. The attack jumped off, 29 November, and carried the division to the river through Welz, Flossdorf, and Linnich.

After a period of aggressive patrolling along the Roer, 4–19 December, the division took over the XIII Corps sector from the Wurm River, north of the village of Wurm, to Barmen on the south, and trained for river crossing. On 23 February 1945, the 102d attacked across the Roer (Operation Grenade), advanced toward Lövenich and Erkelenz, bypassed Mönchengladbach, took Krefeld, 3 March, and reached the Rhine. During March the division was on the defensive along the Rhine, its sector extending from Homburg south to Düsseldorf. Crossing the river on 9 April on pontoon bridge, the division attacked in the Wesergebirge, meeting stiff opposition. After 3 days and nights of terrific enemy resistance Wilsede and Hessisch-Oldendorf fell, 12 April 1945, and the 102d pushed on to the Elbe, meeting little resistance. Breitenfeld fell, 15 April, and the division outposted the Elbe River, 48 miles from Berlin, its advance halted on orders. Storkau experienced fighting on the 16th, EHRA on the 21st along with Fallersleben. On 3 May 1945 the 102nd shook hands with the Russian 156th Division just outside Berlin.

On 15 April the division discovered a war crime in Gardelegen: the Isenschnibbe Barn Atrocity. About 1,200 prisoners from the Mittelbau-Dora and Hannover-Stöcken concentration camps were forced from a train into an empty barn measuring approximately a hundred by fifty feet on the outskirts of the town. The barn was then set afire, killing those inside. About 1,016 people were killed. However, two men survived, buried under a shield of dead bodies, protecting them from the gunfire and flames.  When the first soldiers arrived at the barn, the two came crawling out from under the dead and burning bodies. Major General Keating ordered that the nearby civilian population be forced to view the site and to disinter and rebury the victims in a new cemetery. After digging the graves and burying the bodies, they erected a cross or a Star of David over each grave and enclosed the site with a white fence. Today both the former crime scene and the Cemetery of Honour are parts of the Isenschnibbe Barn Memorial Gardelegen.

The division patrolled and maintained defensive positions until the end of hostilities in Europe, then moved to Gotha for occupation duty.

Casualties

Total battle casualties: 4,922
Killed in action: 932
Wounded in action: 3,668
Missing in action: 185
Prisoners of war: 137

Assignments in the European Theater of Operations
28 August 1944: Ninth Army, 12th Army Group. 
5 September 1944: III Corps. 
10 October 1944: XVI Corps. 
3 November 1944: XIX Corps. 
7 November 1944: XIII Corps. 
20 December 1944: XIII Corps, Ninth Army (attached to the British 21st Army Group), 12th Army Group. 
1 April 1945: XIII Corps (for administration), Ninth Army, but attached for operations to the Fifteenth Army. 
4 April 1945: XIII Corps, Ninth Army, 12th Army Group.

Post-war History (1946–1965) 
 Headquarters and Headquarters Company, 102nd Infantry Division
 Inactivated 12 March 1946 at Camp Kilmer, New Jersey.
 Assigned 22 October 1946 to the Fifth Army.
 Activated 19 May 1947 at St. Louis, Missouri.
 Inactivated 31 December 1965 at St. Louis, Missouri.

On 1 June 1959, the division was reorganized as a Pentomic Division.  The division's three infantry regiments were inactivated and their elements reorganized into five infantry battle groups.  On 1 April 1963, the division was reorganized as a Reorganization Objective Army Division (ROAD).  Three Brigade Headquarters were activated and Infantry units were reorganized into battalions:

 405th Infantry Regiment
 Inactivated 1 June 1946 at Bayreuth, Germany.
 Activated 31 October 1946 with headquarters at Minneapolis, Minnesota.
 Inactivated 3 January 1947 at Minneapolis.
 Activated 24 January 1947 with headquarters at St. Louis, Missouri.
 Headquarters relocated to Danville, Illinois 15 March 1948, to Anna, Illinois 1 February 1950, to Marion, Illinois 2 January 1956, and to East St. Louis, Illinois 24 November 1956.
 Inactivated 31 May 1959 at East St. Louis, concurrently, Headquarters and Headquarters Company consolidated with Headquarters and Headquarters Company Headquarters, 3d Battle Group, 9th Infantry.
 The Battle Group was activated 1 June 1959 with headquarters at Quincy, Illinois.  Reorganized and redesignated as the 3d Battalion, 9th Infantry on 1 April 1963, and inactivated at Quincy on 31 December 1965.
 406th Infantry Regiment
 Inactivated 16 March 1946 at Camp Kilmer, New Jersey.
 Activated 3 January 1947 with headquarters at Kansas City, Missouri.
 Inactivated 11 May 1959 at Kansas City, concurrently, Headquarters and Headquarters Company consolidated with Headquarters and Headquarters Company Headquarters, 3d Battle Group, 14th Infantry.
 The Battle Group was activated 1 June 1959 with headquarters at Kansas City, Missouri. Reorganized and redesignated as the 3d Battalion, 14th Infantry on 1 April 1963, and inactivated at Kansas City on 31 December 1965.
 407th Infantry Regiment
 Inactivated 16 March 1946 at Camp Kilmer, New Jersey.
 Activated 15 March 1948 with headquarters at St. Louis, Missouri.
 Inactivated 31 May 1959 at St. Louis, concurrently, Headquarters and Headquarters Company consolidated with Headquarters and Headquarters Company Headquarters, 4th Battle Group, 6th Infantry.
 The Battle Group was activated 1 June 1959 with headquarters at St. Louis, Missouri.  Reorganized and redesignated as the 4th Battalion, 6th Infantry on 1 April 1963, and inactivated at St. Louis on 31 December 1965.

Two additional Battle Groups were also formed:

 The 3d Battle Group, 7th Infantry was activated 1 June 1959 with headquarters in Danville, Illinois and inactivated there on 1 April 1963.
 The 3d Battle Group, 4th Infantry was activated 1 June 1959 with headquarters at Fairfield, Illinois.  Reorganized and redesignated as the 3d Battalion, 4th Infantry on 1 April 1963, and inactivated at Fairfield on 31 December 1965.

The division and subordinate elements were inactivated on 31 December 1965. Later, when the 102d Army Reserve Command was formed as a regional headquarters for Army Reserve units within the same general area where the 102d Infantry Division had been located, the shoulder sleeve insignia was authorized for wear by units of the 102d ARCOM, such as the military police unit stationed at Richards Gebaur AFB near Belton, Missouri.  The lineage of the 102d Division is perpetuated by the 102d Training Division.

Subordinate units 

The division was reactivated on September 16, 2008 as the 102nd Training Division; with headquarters concurrently activated at Fort Snelling, Minnesota. The division's location was changed on April 1, 2017 to Fort Leonard Wood, Missouri,
As of 2017 the following units are subordinated to the division:

 1st Brigade (Engineer)
 80th Battalion (Engineer)
 95th Battalion (Engineer)
 100th Battalion (Engineer)
 104th Battalion (Engineer)
 108th Battalion (Engineer)
 2nd Brigade (Military Police)
 80th Battalion (Military Police)
 95th Battalion (Military Police)
 100th Battalion (Military Police)
 104th Battalion (Military Police)
 108th Battalion (Military Police)
 3rd Brigade (Chemical)
 80th Battalion (Chemical)
 95th Battalion (Chemical)
 100th Battalion (Chemical)
 104th Battalion (Chemical)
 108th Battalion (Chemical)
 5th Brigade (Signal)
 2nd Battalion (Signal), 104th Regiment
 3rd Battalion (Signal), 80th Regiment
 3rd Battalion (Signal), 95th Regiment
 3rd Battalion (Signal), 100th Regiment
 3rd Battalion (Signal), 108th Regiment
 High Tech Regional Training Site-Maintenance (Sacramento)
 High Tech Regional Training Site-Maintenance (Tobyhanna)
 Signal School Detachment (D113), Fort Gordon, GA

References

External links
With the 102d Infantry Division through Germany

102d Infantry Division, U.S.
Infantry Division, U.S. 102d
Military units and formations established in 1921
1942 establishments in Texas
1946 disestablishments in New Jersey
Infantry divisions of the United States Army in World War II
Training divisions of the United States Army